The 2021 Louisiana Ragin' Cajuns baseball team represented the University of Louisiana at Lafayette during the 2021 NCAA Division I baseball season. The Ragin' Cajuns played their home games at M. L. Tigue Moore Field at Russo Park and were led by second–year head coach Matt Deggs. They were members of the Sun Belt Conference.

Previous season
On March 12, 2020, the Sun Belt Conference announced the indefinite suspension of all spring athletics, including baseball, due to the increasing risk of the COVID-19 pandemic. On March 13, Louisiana governor John Bel Edwards signed an executive order banning gatherings of over 250 people until as early as April 18, thus ending all possible future 2020 home or in-state games until that time if the season were to continue. Soon after, the Sun Belt cancelled all season and postseason play.

Preseason

Signing Day Recruits

Sun Belt Conference Coaches Poll
The Sun Belt Conference Coaches Poll was released on February 15, 2021 and the Cajuns were picked to finish third in the West Division and fourth overall in the conference.

Preseason All-Sun Belt Team & Honors
Aaron Funk (LR, Pitcher)
Jordan Jackson (GASO, Pitcher)
Conor Angel (LA, Pitcher)
Wyatt Divis (UTA, Pitcher)
Lance Johnson (TROY, Pitcher)
Caleb Bartolero (TROY, Catcher)
William Sullivan (TROY, 1st Base)
Luke Drumheller (APP, 2nd Base)
Drew Frederic (TROY, Shortstop)
Cooper Weiss (CCU, 3rd Base)
Ethan Wilson (USA, Outfielder)
Parker Chavers (CCU, Outfielder)
Rigsby Mosley (TROY, Outfielder)
Eilan Merejo (GSU, Designated Hitter)
Andrew Beesly (ULM, Utility)

Roster

Coaching staff

Schedule and results

Schedule Source:
*Rankings are based on the team's current ranking in the D1Baseball poll.

Posteason

Conference Accolades 
Player of the Year: Mason McWhorter – GASO
Pitcher of the Year: Hayden Arnold – LR
Freshman of the Year: Garrett Gainous – TROY
Newcomer of the Year: Drake Osborn – LA
Coach of the Year: Mark Calvi – USA

All Conference First Team
Connor Cooke (LA)
Hayden Arnold (LR)
Carlos Tavera (UTA)
Nick Jones (GASO)
Drake Osborn (LA)
Robbie Young (APP)
Luke Drumheller (APP)
Drew Frederic (TROY)
Ben Klutts (ARST)
Mason McWhorter (GASO)
Logan Cerny (TROY)
Ethan Wilson (USA)
Cameron Jones (GSU)
Ben Fitzgerald (LA)

All Conference Second Team
JoJo Booker (USA)
Tyler Tuthill (APP)
Jeremy Lee (USA)
Aaron Barkley (LR)
BT Riopelle (CCU)
Dylan Paul (UTA)
Travis Washburn (ULM)
Eric Brown (CCU)
Grant Schulz (ULM)
Tyler Duncan (ARST)
Parker Chavers (CCU)
Josh Smith (GSU)
Andrew Miller (UTA)
Noah Ledford (GASO)

References:

Rankings

References

Louisiana
Louisiana Ragin' Cajuns baseball seasons
Louisiana Ragin' Cajuns baseball